Ifangni  is a town, arrondissement, and commune in the Plateau Department of south-eastern Benin. The commune covers an area of 242 square kilometres and as of 2002 had a population of 113,749 (2013) people.

References

Communes of Benin
Arrondissements of Benin
Populated places in the Plateau Department